Eastern Slovenia is one of the two NUTS-2 Regions of Slovenia.  The region forms the eastern part of the country and includes the cities of Maribor, Celje and Velenje.  It is the poorer of the two regions of Slovenia.

Eastern Slovenia (SI01) is divided into the following statistical regions:

 Mura
 Drava 
 Carinthia
 Savinja
 Central Sava
 Lower Sava
 Southeast Slovenia
 Littoral–Inner Carniola

References

NUTS 2 statistical regions of Slovenia
NUTS 2 statistical regions of the European Union